Anopheles elegans is a species complex of mosquito belonging to the genus Anopheles. It is found in India and Sri Lanka. In India, it is known to breed in shaded stagnant waters and tree holes. It is a natural vector of simian malaria in both countries.

References

External links
Anopheles elegans, a natural vector of simian malaria in Ceylon

elegans
Insects described in 1903